The Oman Handball Association (OHA) is the administrative and controlling body for handball and beach handball in Sultanate of Oman. OHA is a member of the Asian Handball Federation (AHF) and member of the International Handball Federation (IHF) since 1982.

National teams
 Oman men's national handball team
 Oman men's national junior handball team
 Oman men's national beach handball team
 Oman women's national handball team

Competitions hosted

International
 2012 Beach Handball World Championships

Continental
 2026 Asian Men's Handball Championship
 2025 Asian Men's Club League Handball Championship
 2018 Asian Men's Junior Handball Championship
 2015 Asian Beach Handball Championship
 2011 Asian Beach Handball Championship
 2010 Asian Beach Games
 2006 Asian Men's Club League Handball Championship
 2004 Asian Beach Handball Championship

References

External links

Sports governing bodies in Oman